Julien Maury (born 1978 in Paris) and Alexandre Bustillo (born 1975 in Saint-Cloud, France) are French filmmakers who work together on their projects. They list their influences as Dario Argento, Roman Polanski, Clive Barker and John Carpenter.

Life and career 
Julien Maury graduated from l’École Supérieure de Réalisation Audiovisuelle. He worked for French television before directing documentaries, music videos and short films. Alexandre Bustillo graduated from Université Paris XIII with an M.A. in cinema, before working as a journalist for several magazines including Mad Movies. The two met each other through a mutual friend.

Their first film was Inside, a controversial horror film about a pregnant woman stalked by a madwoman who wants her child for herself. Both men co-directed and Bustillo wrote the script. The film was cited as an example of the new wave of French horror films and was a critical success that brought international attention on Maury and Bustillo.

After the success of Inside, Maury and Bustillo were attached to at separate times to Halloween II, the sequel to Rob Zombie's remake of John Carpenter's Halloween as well as the remake for Clive Barker's Hellraiser. In both cases, they left the project.

Their subsequent film Livid was released 2011.  The film was initially intended to be Bustillo and Maury's English-language debut and shot in the United Kingdom but they moved to a lower-budget French production after they found that they were losing creative control over their story. The two are also set to do a segment on Paris, I'll Kill You, a horror film anthology set in Paris, France.

Filmography

Feature films

Other works

References

External links
 
 

French film directors
French male screenwriters
French screenwriters
Horror film directors
Living people
Year of birth missing (living people)